Gikū or Yikong was an early Heian period Buddhist monk from Tang China.  He is Japan's first Buddhist monk who exclusively taught Zen.

Legacy
There are many unknown facts about Gikū such as his birthplace, birth date and death date.  However, he was an important disciple of Yanguan Qi'an, a renowned 9th generation Zen master descended from Mazu Daoyi.  

During the Jowa period (834-848 CE), Empress Dowager Tachibana Kachiko dispatched Egaku on several trips to Tang China for pilgrimage and to invite a Zen monk back to Japan to propagate Zen Buddhism in Japan.  In 841 CE, Egaku went on his first trip to Tang China.  He went on a pilgrimage to Mount Wutai.  Later he traveled to Hangzhou's Lingchi Monastery to meet Yanguan Qi'an.  Egaku conveys Tachibana Kachiko's wishes to invite Yanguan Qi'an back to Japan to propagate Zen Buddhism.  However, Yanguan Qi'an instead suggested Gikū as a replacement. On this trip, Egaku also took vows of providing support for the Sangha.  This vow required him to return to Japan.  Gikū did not return with Egaku on this trip.

Egaku returned to Tang China in 844 CE.  Armed with religious offerings made by the Empress Dowager, he went again on pilgrimage to Mount Wutai.  Later he went to Lingchi Monastery to honor Yanguan Qi'an.  However, Yanguan Qi'an had already died two years earlier.  Gikū agrees to accompany Egaku back to Japan. However, in 845 CE, the Huichang Persecution intervenes and reaches its zenith and Egaku had to pretend to return to secular life.  The Huichang Persecution ends when Emperor Xuanzong ascends the throne in 846 CE.   Egaku then returns with Gikū to Japan in 847 CE. 

Aristocratic Heian society enthusiastically received Gikū's arrival in Japan as he was the first Zen monk from China who exclusively taught Zen Buddhism in Japan.   Tachibana Kachiko first housed him in the western wing of Tō-ji Temple; then moved him to Danrin Temple once it became completed.  Gikū taught Zen Buddhism for several years there and then returned to Tang China. 

After Gikū returns to Tang China, Egaku a few years later returns to Tang China.  On this trip, Egaku had an "agate-colored stele" made on his behalf in Suzhou's Kaiyuan Monastery by the Chinese Zen monk Qieyuan, entitled "Record of the Nation of Japan’s First Zen School." This agate stele once stood in Heian-kyō's Rashōmon, and Tōdai-ji once preserved four large fragments of this stele. The significance of this agate stele is that it was one of the few contemporaneous records describing Egaku’s recruitment of Gikū as the first Zen monk to Japan.  It was one of the sources used by Kokan Shiren to write the Egaku article found in Japan's earliest Buddhist history, the Genkō Shakusho.

Notes

References

Sources

 

 

 

 

 

 

 

9th-century Japanese people
Year of birth uncertain
Year of death uncertain
Zen Buddhist monks
Chan Buddhist monks
Tang dynasty Buddhist monks
Heian period Buddhist clergy